Michael Robotham (born 9 November 1960) is an Australian crime fiction writer who has twice won the CWA Gold Dagger award for best novel and twice been shortlisted for the Edgar Award for best novel. His eldest child is Alexandra Hope Robotham, professionally known as Alex Hope, an Australian producer, songwriter, and multi-instrumentalist.

Career
Robotham was born in Casino, New South Wales, and went to school in Gundagai and Coffs Harbour. In February 1979 he began a journalism cadetship on the Sydney afternoon newspaper The Sun and later worked for The Sydney Morning Herald as a court reporter and police roundsman.

In 1986, he went to London, where he worked as a reporter and sub-editor for various UK national newspapers before becoming a staff feature writer on The Mail on Sunday in 1989. As a feature writer, Michael was among the first people to view the letters and diaries of Tsar Nicholas II and his wife Empress Alexandra, unearthed in the Moscow State Archives in 1991. He also gained access to Stalin's Hitler files, which had been missing for nearly fifty years until a cleaner stumbled upon a cardboard box that had been misplaced and misfiled. The archives also revealed secrets about Rasputin and the nuclear accident at Chernobyl.

Robotham rose to become deputy features editor of The Mail on Sunday before resigning in May 1993 and accepting freelancing contracts with a number of British newspapers and magazines. In November 1993 he accepted his first ghostwriting commission, helping Nottingham social worker Margaret Humphreys to pen her autobiography, Empty Cradles. Published in 1994, it told the story of how she uncovered the truth behind Britain's Child Migrant Program, which saw more than 100,000 children sent abroad between 1850 and 1967, and established the Child Migrant Trust to reunite children with their families. In 2011 Empty Cradles became the basis of the film Oranges and Sunshine directed by Jim Loach and starring Emily Watson as Margaret Humphreys and Hugo Weaving and David Wenham as two of the child migrants.

Robotham went on to collaborate on fifteen "autobiographies" for people in the arts, politics, the military and sport. Twelve of these titles became Sunday Times bestsellers and sold more than 2 million copies. These books included the autobiographies of Spice Girl Geri Halliwell, British comedy actor Ricky Tomlinson and sixties musical legend Lulu.

In 1996 Robotham returned to Australia with his family and continued writing full-time. In 2002, a partial manuscript of his first novel, The Suspect, became the subject of a bidding war at the London Book Fair. It was later translated into 24 languages and sold over a million copies around the world. His books have since won, or been shortlisted for numerous awards including the UK and US

Six of his 'Joe O'Loughlin novels' have been turned into TV movies in Germany (situated in Hamburg), and an English-language TV series based on the first Joe O'Loughlin novel, The Suspect, began filming in October 2021 in London and Liverpool with Aidan Turner in the lead role, produced by World Production. His stand-alone novel The Secrets She Keeps was turned into a six-part TV series by Network 10 in Australia and became one of the most watched TV shows on BBC1 in 2020. A second series of The Secrets She Keeps began filming in Sydney in December 2021. Another standalone, Life or Death has been optioned for film in the US.

Awards and nominations

Ned Kelly Awards for Crime Writing, Best Novel, 2005: winner for Lost
Ned Kelly Awards for Crime Writing, Best Novel, 2007: shortlisted for The Night Ferry
Crime Writers' Association (UK), Ian Fleming Steel Dagger, 2007: shortlisted for The Night Ferry
Ned Kelly Awards for Crime Writing, Best Novel, 2008: winner for Shatter
Crime Writers' Association (UK), The CWA Ian Fleming Steel Dagger, Best Thriller, 2008: shortlisted for Shatter
ITV Thriller Awards (UK), Breakthrough Novelist 2008: shortlisted for Shatter
Crime Writers' Association (UK), The CWA Gold Dagger, Best Crime Novel, 2013: shortlisted for Say You're Sorry
Crime Writers' Association (UK), The CWA Gold Dagger, Best Crime Novel, 2015: winner for Life or Death
Edgar Award for Best Novel, 2020: finalist for Good Girl, Bad Girl
Crime Writers' Association (UK), The CWA Gold Dagger, Best Crime Novel, 2020: winner for Good Girl Bad Girl
Crime Writers Association (UK), Ian Fleming Steel Dagger, 2021: winner for When She Was Good

Personal
His eldest child is the ARIA- and APRA Award-winning songwriter, producer and musician Alex Hope.

Bibliography

Joseph O'Loughlin series
The Suspect (2004) 
Lost (2005) (aka The Drowning Man) 
Shatter (2008)
Bleed For Me (2010) 
The Wreckage (2011) 
Say You're Sorry (2012) 
Watching You (2013) 
Close Your Eyes (2015) 
The Other Wife (2018)

Cyrus Haven series
Good Girl, Bad Girl (2019) 
When She Was Good (2020) 
Lying Beside You (2022)

Stand-alone novels
The Night Ferry (2007)
Bombproof (2008) 
Life or Death (2014) 
The Secrets She Keeps (2017) 
When You are Mine (2021)

Interviews
"Shots ezine" 2003
"The Advertiser" June 26, 2007
"The Age" August 19, 2007
"reviewingtheevidence" Undated, possibly end 2007
"The Book Show" - discussion with Peter Temple, July 25, 2008
"Conversation with Richard Fidler" ABC July 17, 2017

Neben der Spur - Television film series Germany, ZDF
Adrenalin (The Suspect) 2014
Amnesie (Drowned) 2015

References

External links
 Official website

1960 births
Living people
21st-century Australian novelists
Australian male novelists
Ned Kelly Award winners
21st-century Australian male writers
People from the Northern Rivers
Australian crime fiction writers